Bijay Chhetri (born 7 July 2001) is an Indian professional footballer who plays as a defender for Sreenidi Deccan in the I-League.

Youth career
Bijay started his footballing career at Shillong Lajong in 2016 playing for their Under 16 and got promoted to the Under 18 and played 2 years at lajong.
He moved to Indian Arrows in 2018-2019 season but because of serious injury could not play any match.

Club career

Chennai City FC
He made his professional debut for the Chennai City F.C. against Aizawl F.C. on 17 December 2019, He started and played full match as Chennai City drew 1–1.

Personal life
He has an older brother Ajay Chhetri who is also a professional footballer currently playing at Hyderabad FC.

Career statistics

Club

References

1999 births
Living people
People from Imphal
Indian footballers
Chennai City FC players
Footballers from Manipur
I-League players
Association football central defenders
Sreenidi Deccan FC players